Hrubčice is a municipality and village in Prostějov District in the Olomouc Region of the Czech Republic. It has about 800 inhabitants.

Administrative parts
The village of Otonovice is an administrative part of Hrubčice.

History
The first written mention of Hrubčice is from 1368.

References

Villages in Prostějov District